Alzheimer's Research UK (ARUK) is a dementia research charity in the United Kingdom, founded in 1992 as the Alzheimer's Research Trust.

ARUK funds scientific studies to find ways to treat, cure or prevent all forms of dementia, including Alzheimer's disease, vascular dementia, dementia with Lewy bodies and frontotemporal dementia.

As of 2019, Alzheimer's Research UK has funded 139 research projects across the UK and internationally, and has committed more than £117 million to dementia research.

Alzheimer's Research UK is a member of the Association of Medical Research Charities.

History

In 1998, the trust awarded its first major grant of £500,000 to a team led by distinguished scientist Dr Michel Goedert in Cambridge. At that time the charity funded over 100 grants all over the UK at a cost of more than £11 million.

In March 2008, author Terry Pratchett, who had the disease, donated one million US dollars to the trust.

In 2009 Alzheimer's Research Trust scientists discovered two new genes related to Alzheimer's. Over 16,000 people took part in this study. Time magazine wrote that the findings were one of the most important medical discoveries of the year.

In February 2010, the Alzheimer's Research Trust released the Dementia 2010 report, revealing new evidence of the prevalence, economic cost and research funding for dementia and other major conditions.

In February 2011 Alzheimer's Research Trust was renamed as Alzheimer's Research UK.

In 2016, Alzheimer's Research UK became a founding funder of the UK Dementia Research Institute, a £290 million joint investment with the Medical Research Council and Alzheimer's Society.

In 2017, former Prime Minister David Cameron was appointed president of Alzheimer's Research UK.

Alzheimer's Research UK and Alzheimer's Society were the joint Charity of the Year for the 2019 Virgin Money London Marathon. The Dementia Revolution campaign raised £4 million, supporting research at the UK Dementia Research Institute.

The charity reported a total income of £38.5m for the 12-month period ending March 2019, £36.7m of which was income from donations.

See also
Alzheimer's Society

References

External links

Alzheimer's and dementia organizations
Health charities in the United Kingdom
Mental health organisations in the United Kingdom
Organisations based in Cambridgeshire
Science and technology in Cambridgeshire
South Cambridgeshire District
1992 establishments in the United Kingdom